Jashn Sara (also Romanized as Jashn Sarā; also known as Chachansaray, Chashmeh Sarāb, and Chashmeh-ye Sarāb) is a village in Bughda Kandi Rural District, in the Central District of Zanjan County, Zanjan Province, Iran. At the 2006 census, its population was 92, in 21 families.

References 

Populated places in Zanjan County